Risto Olavi Kalliorinne (born 11 October 1971 in Raahe) is a Finnish politician currently serving in the Parliament of Finland for the Left Alliance at the Oulu constituency.

References

1971 births
Living people
People from Raahe
Left Alliance (Finland) politicians
Members of the Parliament of Finland (2011–15)
Members of the Parliament of Finland (2019–23)